Canada, the world's second-largest country in total area, is dedicated to having an efficient, high-capacity multimodal transportation spanning often vast distances between natural resource extraction sites, agricultural and urban areas. In 2005, the transportation sector made up 4.2% of Canada's GDP, compared to 3.7% for Canada's mining and oil and gas extraction industries.

Transport Canada oversees and regulates most aspects of transportation within federal jurisdiction, including interprovincial transport. This primarily includes rail, air and maritime transportation. Transport Canada is under the direction of the federal government's Minister of Transport. The Transportation Safety Board of Canada is responsible for maintaining transportation safety in Canada by investigating accidents and making safety recommendations.

History
The standard history covers the French regime, fur traders, the canals, and early roads, and gives extensive attention to the railways.

European contact
Prior to the arrival of European settlers, Aboriginal peoples in Canada walked. They also used  canoes, kayaks, umiaks and Bull Boats, in addition to the snowshoe, toboggan and sled in winter. They had no wheeled vehicles, and no animals larger than dogs.

Europeans adopted canoes as they pushed deeper into the continent's interior, and were thus able to travel via the waterways that fed from the St. Lawrence River and Hudson Bay.

In the 19th century and early 20th century transportation relied on harnessing oxen to Red River ox carts or horse to wagon. Maritime transportation was via manual labour such as canoe or wind on sail.

Settlement was along river routes. Agricultural commodities were perishable, and trade centres were within . The advent of steam railways and steamships connected resources and markets of vast distances in the late 19th century. Railways also connected city centres, in such a way that the traveller went by sleeper, railway hotel, to the cities. Crossing the country by train took four or five days, as it still does by car. People generally lived within  of the downtown core thus the train could be used for inter-city travel and the tram for commuting.

The advent of the interstate or Trans-Canada Highway in Canada in 1963 established ribbon development, truck stops, and industrial corridors along throughways.

Evolution

The Federal Department of Transport (established November 2, 1936) supervised railways, canals, harbours, marine and shipping, civil aviation, radio and meteorology. The Transportation Act of 1938 and the amended Railway Act, placed control and regulation of carriers in the hands of the Board of Transport commissioners for Canada. The Royal Commission on Transportation was formed December 29, 1948, to examine transportation services to all areas of Canada to eliminate economic or geographic disadvantages. The commission also reviewed the Railway Act to provide uniform yet competitive freight-rates.

Roads

As of 2008,  were unpaved.

These vehicles travelled a total of 333.29 billion kilometres, of which 303.6 billion was for vehicles under 4.5 tonnes, 8.3 billion was for vehicles between 4.5 and 15 tonnes and 21.4 billion was for vehicles over 15 tonnes. For the 4.5- to 15-tonne trucks, 88.9% of vehicle-kilometres were intra-province trips, 4.9% were inter-province, 2.8% were between Canada and the US and 3.4% made outside of Canada. For the trucks over 15 tonnes, 59.1% of vehicle-kilometres were intra-province trips, 20% inter-province trips, 13.8% Canada-US trips and 7.1% trips made outside of Canada.

Trucking generated 35% of the total GDP from transport, compared to 25% for rail, water and air combined (the remainder being generated by the industry's transit, pipeline, scenic and support activities). Hence roads are the dominant means of passenger and freight transport in Canada.

Roads and highways were managed by provincial and municipal authorities until construction of the Northwest Highway System (the Alaska Highway) and the Trans-Canada Highway project initiation. The Alaska Highway of 1942 was constructed during World War II for military purposes connecting Fort St. John, British Columbia with Fairbanks, Alaska. The transcontinental highway, a joint national and provincial expenditure, was begun in 1949 under the initiation of the Trans Canada Highway Act on December 10, 1949. The  highway was completed in 1962 at a total expenditure of $1.4 billion.

Internationally, Canada has road links with both the lower 48 US states and Alaska. The Ministry of Transportation maintains the road network in Ontario and also employs Ministry of Transport Enforcement Officers for the purpose of administering the Canada Transportation Act and related regulations. The Department of Transportation in New Brunswick performs a similar task in that province as well.

Regulations enacted in regards to Canada highways are the 1971 Motor Vehicle Safety Act and the 1990 Highway Traffic Act.

The safety of Canada's roads is moderately good by international standards, and is improving both in terms of accidents per head of population and per billion vehicle kilometers.

Air transport

Air transportation made up 9% of the transport sector's GDP generation in 2005. Canada's largest air carrier and its flag carrier is Air Canada, which had 34 million customers in 2006 and, as of April 2010, operates 363 aircraft (including Air Canada Jazz). CHC Helicopter, the largest commercial helicopter operator in the world, is second with 142 aircraft and WestJet, a low-cost carrier formed in 1996, is third with 100 aircraft. Canada's airline industry saw significant change following the signing of the US-Canada open skies agreement in 1995, when the marketplace became less regulated and more competitive.

The Canadian Transportation Agency employs transportation enforcement officers to maintain aircraft safety standards, and conduct periodic aircraft inspections, of all air carriers. The Canadian Air Transport Security Authority is charged with the responsibility for the security of air traffic within Canada. In 1994 the National Airports Policy was enacted

Principal airports

Of over 1,800 registered Canadian aerodromes, certified airports, heliports, and floatplane bases, 26 are specially designated under Canada's National Airports System (NAS): these include all airports that handle 200,000 or more passengers each year, as well as the principal airport serving each federal, provincial, and territorial capital. However, since the introduction of the policy only one, Iqaluit Airport, has been added and no airports have been removed despite dropping below 200,000 passengers. The Government of Canada, with the exception of the three territorial capitals, retains ownership of these airports and leases them to local authorities. The next tier consists of 64 regional/local airports formerly owned by the federal government, most of which have now been transferred to other owners (most often to municipalities).

Below is a table of Canada's ten biggest airports by passenger traffic in 2019.

Railways

While intercity passenger transportation by rail is now very limited, freight transport by rail remains common. Total revenues of rail services in 2006 was $10.4 billion, of which only 2.8% was from passenger services. In a year are usually earned about $11 billion, of which 3.2% is from passengers and the rest from freight. The Canadian National and Canadian Pacific Railway are Canada's two major freight railway companies, each having operations throughout North America. In 2007, 357 billion tonne-kilometres of freight were transported by rail, and 4.33 million passengers travelled 1.44 billion passenger-kilometres (an almost negligible amount compared to the 491 billion passenger-kilometres made in light road vehicles). 34,281 people were employed by the rail industry in the same year.

Nationwide passenger services are provided by the federal crown corporation Via Rail. Three Canadian cities have commuter rail services: in the Montreal area by AMT, in the Toronto area by GO Transit, and in the Vancouver area by West Coast Express. Smaller railways such as Ontario Northland, Rocky Mountaineer, and Algoma Central also run passenger trains to remote rural areas.

In Canada railways are served by standard gauge, rails. See also track gauge in Canada.

Canada has railway links with the lower 48 US States, but no connection with Alaska other than a train ferry service from Prince Rupert, British Columbia, although a line has been proposed. There are no other international rail connections.

Waterways

In 2005,  of cargo was loaded and unloaded at Canadian ports. The Port of Vancouver is the busiest port in Canada, moving  or 15% of Canada's total in domestic and international shipping in 2003.

Transport Canada oversees most of the regulatory functions related to marine registration, safety of large vessel, and port pilotage duties. Many of Canada's port facilities are in the process of being divested from federal responsibility to other agencies or municipalities.

Inland waterways comprise , including the St. Lawrence Seaway. Transport Canada enforces acts and regulations governing water transportation and safety.

Ferry services

Passenger ferry service
Vancouver Island and surrounding islands and peninsulas to the British Columbia mainland
Several Sunshine Coast communities to the British Columbia mainland and to Alaska
Internationally to St. Pierre and Miquelon
Automobile ferry service
Nova Scotia to Newfoundland and Labrador
Quebec to Newfoundland across the Strait of Belle Isle
Labrador to Newfoundland
Chandler to the Magdalen Islands, Quebec
Prince Edward Island to the Magdalen Islands, Quebec
Prince Edward Island to Nova Scotia
Digby, Nova Scotia, to Saint John, New Brunswick
Train ferry service
British Columbia to Alaska or Washington state

Canals

The main route canals of Canada are those of the St. Lawrence River and the Great Lakes. The others are subsidiary canals.
 St. Lawrence Seaway
 Welland Canal
 Soo Locks
 Trent-Severn Waterway
 Rideau Canal

Ports and harbours

The National Harbours Board administered Halifax, Saint John, Chicoutimi, Trois-Rivières, Churchill, and Vancouver until 1983. At one time, over 300 harbours across Canada were supervised by the Department of Transport.  A program of divestiture was implemented around the turn of the millennium, and as of 2014, 493 of the 549 sites identified for divestiture in 1995 have been sold or otherwise transferred, as indicated by a DoT list. The government maintains an active divestiture programme, and after divestiture Transport Canada oversees only 17 Canada Port Authorities for the 17 largest shipping ports.

Pacific coast
Victoria, British Columbia
Vancouver, British Columbia
Prince Rupert, British Columbia

Atlantic coast
Halifax, Nova Scotia
Saint John, New Brunswick
St. John's, Newfoundland and Labrador
Sept-Îles, Quebec
Sydney, Nova Scotia
Botwood, Newfoundland and Labrador

Arctic coast
Churchill, Manitoba

Great Lakes and St Lawrence River
Bécancour, Quebec
Hamilton, Ontario
Montreal, Quebec
Quebec City, Quebec
Trois-Rivières, Quebec
Thunder Bay, Ontario
Toronto, Ontario
Windsor, Ontario

Merchant marine

Pipelines

Pipelines are part of the energy extraction and transportation network of Canada and are used to transport natural gas, natural gas liquids, crude oil, synthetic crude and other petroleum based products.

Public transit

Most Canadian cities have public transport, if only a bus system. Three Canadian cities have rapid transit systems, four have light rail systems, and three have commuter rail systems (see below). In 2016, 12.4% of Canadians used public transportation to get to work. This compares to 79.5% that got to work using a car (67.4% driving alone, 12.1% as part of a carpool), 5.5% that walked and 1.4% that rode a bike.

Government organizations across Canada owned 17,852 buses of various types in 2016. Organizations in Ontario (38.8%) and Quebec (21.9%) accounted for just over three-fifths of the country's total bus fleet. Urban municipalities owned more than 85% of all buses.

in 2016, diesel buses were the leading bus type in Canada (65.9%), followed by bio-diesel (18.1%) and hybrid (9.4%) buses. Electric, natural gas and other buses collectively accounted for the remaining 6.6%.

Rapid transit systems

There are three rapid transit systems operating in Canada: the Montreal Metro, the Toronto subway, and the Vancouver SkyTrain.

There is also an airport circulator, the Link Train, at Toronto Pearson International Airport. It operates 24 hours a day, 7 days a week and is wheelchair-accessible. It is free of cost.

Light rail systems

There are light rail systems in four cities – the Calgary CTrain, the Edmonton LRT, the Ottawa O-Train, and Waterloo Region's Ion – while Toronto has an extensive streetcar system.

The 2016 Canada's Core Public Infrastructure Survey from Statistics Canada found that all of Canada's 247 streetcars were owned by the City of Toronto. The vast majority (87.9%) of these streetcars were purchased from 1970 to 1999, while 12.1% were purchased in 2016. Reflecting the age of the streetcars, 88.0% were reported to be in very poor condition, while 12.0% were reported to be in good condition.

Commuter train systems
Commuter trains serve the cities and surrounding areas of Montreal, Toronto and Vancouver:

See also

 Royal Commission on Railways
The Romance of Transportation in Canada, a National Film Board of Canada animated short
 Taxicabs of Canada
 Plug-in electric vehicles in Canada

References

Further reading
 Brown, Ron. Rails Across the Prairies: The Railway Heritage of Canada's Prairie Provinces (Dundurn, 2012)
 Currie, Archibald William. Economics of Canadian transportation (U of Toronto Press, 1954.)
 Daniels, Rudolph L. Trains across the continent: North American railroad history (Indiana University Press, 2000)
 Glazebrook, G.P. de T. A history of transportation in Canada (1938; reprinted 1969), The standard scholarly history
 McCalla, Robert J. Water Transportation in Canada (1994)
 McIlwraith, Thomas F. "Transportation in Old Ontario." American Review of Canadian Studies 14.2 (1984): 177–192.
 Pigott, Peter. Canada: The History (2014); Pigott has numerous books on aviation in Canada
 Schreiner, John. Transportation: The evolution of Canada's networks (McGraw-Hill Ryerson, 1972)
 Stagg, Ronald. The Golden Dream: A History of the St. Lawrence Seaway (Dundurn, 2010)
 Willoughby, William R. The St. Lawrence waterway: a study in politics and diplomacy (University of Wisconsin Press, 1961)

External links
 Directory of Canada Transportation Companies www.transportationindustry.ca
"Transportation and Maps" in Virtual Vault, an online exhibition of Canadian historical art at Library and Archives Canada
 North American transportation statistics